The Falkland Islands general election of 1960 was held on 24 and 25 March 1960 to elect members to the Legislative Council. Four out of the twelve Councillors were elected through universal suffrage, two from Stanley and one each from East Falkland and West Falkland. The Legislative Council was intended to be dissolved on 29 February 1960 but to suit farming arrangements it was dissolved almost two months early, on 2 January.

Results
Candidates in bold were elected.  Candidates in italic were incumbents.

Stanley constituency

East Falkland constituency

West Falkland constituency

References

1960 elections in South America
1960
General election
Non-partisan elections
March 1960 events in South America
1960 elections in the British Empire